Breakwater Battery, was a coastal defence battery at Port Kembla, New South Wales, Australia during World War II.

Constructed in 1939 to provide protection for Port Kembla from enemy shipping and submarines. Two 6 inch Mk XI gun emplacements with related underground facilities were constructed near the southern breakwater at Port Kembla.

The battery and observation post (now a military museum) were key structures of the command centre for Fortress Kembla during World War II.

Gallery

See also

 Military history of Australia

References
 NSW Heritage Listing

External links
 Breakwater Battery Military Museum - Museums and Galleries of New South Wales

Batteries in Australia
Buildings and structures in Wollongong
Bunkers in Oceania
Forts in Australia
History of Wollongong
Military and war museums in Australia
Museums in New South Wales
World War II museums
Tourist attractions in Wollongong